Mehbudi-ye Sofla (also Romanized as Mehbūdī-ye Soflá; also known as Mehbūdī-ye Pā’īn) is a village in Famur Rural District, Jereh and Baladeh District, Kazerun County, Fars Province, Iran. At the 2006 census, its population was 803, in 157 families.

References 

Populated places in Kazerun County